The Deccanis or Deccani People are an ethnoreligious community of Urdu-speaking Muslims who inhabit, or trace their ancestry from, the Deccan region of Southern and Central India, and speak the Deccani dialect. The community traces its origins to the shifting of the Delhi Sultanate's capital from Delhi to Daulatabad in 1327 during the reign of Muhammad bin Tughluq. The migration of Hindavi-speaking people to the Deccan, and the conversion of local Hindus to Islam, led to the creation of a new community of Urdu-speaking Muslims, known as the Deccani, who would come to play an important role in the politics of the Deccan. Their language, Deccani Urdu, emerged as a language of linguistic prestige and culture during the Bahmani Sultanate, further evolving in the Deccan Sultanates.

Following the demise of the Bahmanis, the Deccan Sultanate period marked a golden age for Deccani culture, notably in the arts, language, and architecture. The Deccani people form the second largest ethnic group in the Deccan states of Maharashtra, Telangana, Andhra Pradesh, and Karnataka, and form a majority in the old cities of Hyderabad and Aurangabad. After the partition of British India and the annexation of Hyderabad, large diaspora communities formed outside the Deccan, especially in Pakistan, where they make up a significant portion of the Urdu speaking minority, the Muhajirs.

The Deccani People are further divided into various groups, most notably the Hyderabadis (from Hyderabad Deccan), Mysoris (from Mysore state), and Madrasis (from Madras state) (including Kurnool, Nellore, Guntur, Chennai muslims). Deccani Urdu is the mother-tongue of most Muslims in the states of Maharashtra, Goa, Karnataka, Telangana, Andhra Pradesh, and it is spoken by a section of Muslims from Tamil Nadu.

History
The word Deccani ( from Prakrit dakkhin "south") was derived in the court of Bahmani rulers in 1487 AD during Sultan Mahmood Shah Bahmani II. 

The Bahmanid empire was founded by Hasan Gangu, who was one of the inhabitants of Delhi who were forced to immigrate to Daulatabad in the during the Delhi Sultanate, with the purpose of building a large Muslim urban centre in the Deccan. These North Indian Urdu-speaking immigrants established an independent state, and eventually began adopting a distinct Deccani political identity.

Though few in number, the Deccanis became disproportionately powerful in the Tamil and Telugu country because they included the soldiers and service people who constituted the region's first sizeable Muslim political elite.

The Vijayanagara Wars
The Bahmanids' aggressive confrontation with the two main Hindu kingdoms of the southern Deccan, Warangal and Vijayanagar, made them renowned among Muslims as warriors of the faith. Ahmad Shah Bahmani I conquered Warangal kingdom in 1425, annexing it to the empire. The Vijayanagar empire, which had subdued the Madurai Sultanate after a conflict lasting four decades, found a natural enemy in the Bahmanids of the northern Deccan, over the control of the Godavari-basin, Tungabadhra Doab, and the Marathwada country, although they seldom required a pretext for declaring war. Military conflicts between the Bahmanids and Vijayanagara were almost a regular feature and lasted as long as these kingdoms continued. These military conflicts resulted in widespread devastation of the contested areas by both sides, resulting in considerable loss of life and property. Military slavery involved captured slaves from Vijayanagar and having them embrace a Deccani identity by converting them to Islam and integrating into the host society, so they could begin military careers within the Bahmanid empire. This was the origin of powerful political leaders such as Nizam-ul-Mulk Bahri.

Deccan Sultanates
The five Deccan Sultanates of diverse origins continued to identify as successor states of the Bahmanid dynasty as the basis of legitimacy, and minted Bahmanid coins rather than issue their own coins. In their courts existed a shared identity group that was most associated with, and committed to their political system, known in Persian historiography as the Deccanis. The perspective of the Deccanis was largely responsible for the definition of the political landscape of the Deccan. The Nizam Shahs and Berar Shahs were founded by the heads of the Deccani Muslim party. The Adil Shahi Sultanate, which was founded by a Shia Georgian slave, also switched to a Deccani ethnic and political identity under Ibrahim Adil Shah I, who established Sunnism (the religion of the Deccani Muslims). He degraded the Afaqis (Persians) and dismissed them from their posts with a few exceptions, replacing them with nobles of the Deccani party. Uniting in a coalition under the leadership of Hussain Nizam Shah, the Nizam Shahi Sultan, the five Deccan Sultanates defeated the Hindu Vijayanagar empire in the Battle of Talikota, resulting in the Sack of Vijayanagara. Hussain Nizam Shah personally beheaded the Vijayanagar Emperor, Rama Raya.

18th century
Muslim military men with Dakhni background were much sought after by the Marava and Kallar warrior chiefs of the south Indian hinterland. Their fortress towns soon acquired concentrations of migrant Dakhnis and Urdu-speaking service people, mostly Sunnis. These incomers included seasoned fighters who had seen service with the Mughals and the muslim states in northern india. This was the source of the phenomenal rise of rulers such as Hyder Ali and Tipu Sultan.

Sultanat-i-Khudadad of Mysore
Hyder Ali had initially served as an ordinary soldier for the Hindu Wadeyar Kingdom of Mysore and became a cavalry officer in 1749. As soon as Hyder Ali took control of the army, he took advantage of court politics, stormed into Srirangapatna and proclaimed himself ruler of Mysore. Having set up as a military dictator in 1761, Hyder Ali launched an unprovoked war against the Marathas, to divert the attention of the people from the sudden change of masters. With the withdrawal of Madhav Rao, he overran the Hindu principality of Bednur, Sunda and Karnuland its immense booty enormously increased Hyder Ali's power.

Culture

See also 
South Asian ethnic groups
Dakhini
Hyderabadi Muslims
Andhra Muslims

Further reading
URBAN CULTURE OF MEDIEVAL DECCAN (1300 A.D. TO 1650 A.D.)
Bulletin of the Deccan College Post-Graduate and Research Institute, Volume 22 (1963)

References 

Muhajir communities
Social groups of Andhra Pradesh
Urdu-speaking people